PDT may refer to:

Computing
 PHP Development Tools, an IDE plugin for the Eclipse platform
 PDT Standard Police Digital Trunking, China's police wireless communications standard
 Portable data terminal, an electronic device that is used to enter or retrieve data via wireless transmission

Science and medicine
 Patient-delivered therapy
 Photodynamic therapy, treatment for cancer and wet age-related macular degeneration, involving a photosensitizer, light, and tissue oxygen
 Population doubling time, a number indicating cell growth in cell cultures
 Pancreaticoduodenal transplantation (see Pancreas transplantation)
 1,3-Propanedithiol, an organosulfur compound

Business and finance
 Paramount Domestic Television, United States television series distributor, now CBS Television Distribution
 Piedmont Airlines (ICAO airline code), an American regional airline
 PDT Partners, a hedge fund company in New York City that was formerly the trading division of Morgan Stanley
 Pattern day trader (also Pattern day trading, PDT violation), a stock trader who frequently buys and sells a security within the same trading day

Organizations
 Partido Democrático Trabalhista (Democratic Labour Party), a political party of Brazil
 Phi Delta Theta, an international fraternity

Linguistics
 Prague Dependency Treebank, a subset of the Czech National Corpus
 Plautdietsch (ISO 639-3 language code), a Low Prussian variety of East Low German, with Dutch influence

Other
 Please Don't Tell, a cocktail bar in New York City
 Pacific Daylight Time (UTC−7), daylight saving time in western North America
 Eastern Oregon Regional Airport (IATA airport code), near Pendleton, Oregon
 Potentially dangerous taxpayer, an American taxpayer that has demonstrated a capacity for violence against the IRS
 Peter Dengate Thrush, New Zealand barrister